Buntine may refer to:

Buntine, Western Australia, town in Western Australia
Buntine Highway, highway in the Northern Territory and Western Australia
The Buntine Oration held by the Australian College of Educators

People with the surname
Agnes Buntine (c. 1822-1896), Scottish pastoralist and bullocky
Arnold Buntine (1898–1975), Australian rules footballer and headmaster 
Hugh Buntine (1895–1970), Australian rugby union player
Gladys "Jim" Buntine (1901–1992), Australian Chief Commissioner of Girl Guides
Matthew Buntine (born 1993), Australian rules footballer